Leo Köpp (born 23 May 1998) is a German racewalking athlete. He represented Germany at the 2020 Summer Olympics in Tokyo 2021, competing in men's 20 kilometres walk.

His biggest solo success so far was a victory at he 2017 IAAF U20 Europacup in Poděbrady. He also won a bronze medal with his team at the 2021 European Race Walking Team Championships, again held in Poděbrady.

He is currently an athlete of the athletics club LG Nord Berlin.

References

1998 births
Living people
German male racewalkers
Athletes (track and field) at the 2020 Summer Olympics
Olympic athletes of Germany